Franklin Delton Turner (July 19, 1933–December 31, 2013), was an American prelate of the Episcopal Church who served as the Suffragan Bishop of Pennsylvania from 1988 to 2000.

Early life and education
Turner was born in Norwood, North Carolina on July 19, 1933, the son of James and Dora S. Turner. He gained his Bachelor of Arts in Sociology and History from Livingstone College in 1956. He also graduated with a Bachelor of Sacred Theology from Berkeley Divinity School in 1965 with a Master of Divinity. Between 1961 and 1962 he also studied some social work courses at the West Virginia University. He married Barbara Dickerson and together had two daughters.

Ordained ministry
He was ordained to the diaconate in June 1965 by the Leland Stark, the Bishop of Newark, and to the priesthood later on that same year. He then became vicar of the Church of the Epiphany in Dallas, Texas and in 1966 became rector of St George's Church in Washington, D.C., a post he retained till 1972.  He was also Staff Officer for Black Ministries and Founder and President Washington Episcopal Clergy Association. He was also a member of the Board of Directors of the Kanuga Conference Center and a member of the Board of Trustees of Berkeley/Yale Divinity School. He was also a strong advocate for recruitment of Black leaders for Ministry and foundered the organization of Black Episcopal Seminarians.

Bishop
Turner was consecrated Suffragan Bishop of the Diocese of Pennsylvania on October 7, 1988, in the Roman Catholic Cathedral of St Peter and St Paul by Presiding Bishop Edmond L. Browning. He served in the post till his retirement in 2000.

References

20th-century Anglican bishops in the United States
1933 births
2013 deaths
African-American Episcopalians
People from Norwood, North Carolina
Livingstone College alumni
Yale Divinity School alumni
Episcopal bishops of Pennsylvania
20th-century African-American people